Abraham Bagdadi Estrella (born 29 March 1963) is a Mexican politician affiliated with the Party of the Democratic Revolution. He served as federal deputy of the LVII and LIX Legislatures of the Mexican Congress as a plurinominal representative, as well as a local deputy in the Congress of Colima.

References

1963 births
Living people
Politicians from Campeche City
Members of the Chamber of Deputies (Mexico)
Party of the Democratic Revolution politicians
20th-century Mexican politicians
21st-century Mexican politicians
Members of the Congress of Colima
Deputies of the LIX Legislature of Mexico